T8M-900 is a tram manufactured by the Bulgarian company Tramkar in Sofia in 1991.

References 

Tram vehicles of Bulgaria
Tramkar trams
Transport in Sofia